Geograpsus lividus is a species of crab in the family Grapsidae.

Description
Cephalothorax is globose, smooth and without tubercles. Chelar tubercles are restricted to the upper half of the chelae.

Distribution
G. lividus is present in the western Atlantic Ocean and in the East Pacific. It can be found on both coasts of America from the central Gulf to Chile and the Galapagos Islands, and from Florida to Brazil.

Habitat
These crabs live among rocks and stones and in the high tide and splash zones.

References

Williams, Austin B., Lawrence G. Abele, D. L. Felder, H. H. Hobbs Jr., R. B. Manning, et al. (1989) Common and Scientific Names of Aquatic Invertebrates from the United States and Canada: Decapod Crustaceans, American Fisheries Society Special Publication 17

External links
 Flickr
  Crusties
 Crustaceos

Grapsidae
Taxa named by Henri Milne-Edwards
Crustaceans described in 1837